March 2016

See also

References

 03
March 2016 events in the United States